The 1903 Detroit College Tigers football team  was an American football team that represented Detroit College (renamed the University of Detroit in 1911) as an independent during the 1903 college football season. In its first season under head coach W. Alfred Debo, the team compiled a 3–4 record and were outscored its opponents by a combined total of 71 to 23. The team lost to the Michigan freshman team by a 45–0 score.

Schedule

References

Detroit College Tigers
Detroit Titans football seasons
Detroit College Tigers football
Detroit College Tigers football